Ram Chandra Dome (born 8 February 1959, Chilla village) is an Indian politician and a Politburo member of the Communist Party of India. A doctor by profession, he was elected to the Lok Sabha for seven consecutive terms. He is the first member from the scheduled castes to be inducted in the politburo. He has also been serving as the national general secretary of Dalit Shoshan Mukti Mancha, CPI(M)'s frontal organisation for backward castes, since 2018.

Early political life
Dome's engagement with people's movements began when he joined SFI in the 1970s. He later participated in the youth movement and became central committee member of DYFI. He also took part in peasant movements and joined CPI (M) as a whole-timer in 1977.

Along with his hectic political work, Dome makes sure he takes out time to continue charitable medical practice for the needy and the weaker sections of the society.

He was elected to the Lok Sabha from Birbhum constituency in West Bengal for the first time in 1989.

Political career
He continued to represent Birbhum constituency in 1991, 1996, 1998, 1999 and 2004. In 2009, he was elected to the Lok Sabha from Bolpur constituency.

Dome has been a member of parliamentary committee for Ministry of Health and Family Welfare during 1990–1991. He also served as a member of parliamentary committee for Ministry of Human Resource Development from 1991 to 2004.

During 1996–1997, he was a member of the estimates committee and committee on MP Local Area Development Scheme (MPLAD) from 2006 to 2008.

He was a member of Lok Sabha from 1989 to 2009 and was associated with the ministry of Health and Family Welfare.

He was the Chief Whip of Communist Party of India (Marxist) in the Lok Sabha from 2009 to 2014. He also served as a member of parliamentary committee for railways from 2009 to 2014.

He has also been the Chairman of Sriniketan Santiniketan Development Authority in Bolpur, West Bengal. He also served as member of the court of Viswa-Bharati University and the governing body of Indian Council of Medical Research.

Dome has been elected to the state committee and was elected as district secretary of the CPI(M) Birbhum district committee in 2012. He was elected to the central committee and the West Bengal state secretariat in 2015.

Dome was elected as the national general secretary of Dalit Shoshan Mukti Mancha, CPI(M)'s frontal organisation for backward castes, in 2018. He was re-elected in 2022. 
 
He was included in the Politburo in 2022 and is the first member belonging to the scheduled castes on the top decision*-making body on CPI(M).

He contested from Bolpur constituency in 2014 and 2019 and lost. He was also defeated from the Suri Assembly Constituency in 2016 West Bengal Legislative Assembly election.

During 2018 Panchayat elections he was attacked by the Trinamool Congress and was left bloodied and injured while leading a procession with candidates for filing nomination at Nalhati BDO office in Birbhum.

Personal life
Dome has been married to Bandana Dome née Das since 1987. The couple has one daughter. They currently reside in Suri, Birbhum. Along with his hectic political work, Dome makes sure he takes out time to continue charitable medical practice for the needy and the weaker sections of the society.

External links
 Detailed Profile of Dr. Ram Chandra Dome in india.gov.in website
 Dr. Ram Chandra Dome political profile

1959 births
Communist Party of India (Marxist) politicians from West Bengal
People from Birbhum district
University of Calcutta alumni
Living people
India MPs 2004–2009
India MPs 2009–2014
India MPs 1989–1991
India MPs 1991–1996
India MPs 1996–1997
India MPs 1998–1999
India MPs 1999–2004
Lok Sabha members from West Bengal
Communist Party of India (Marxist) candidates in the 2014 Indian general election